Cyril White (1 January 1909 – 30 November 1987) was a South African cricketer. He played in 38 first-class matches from 1929/30 to 1950/51. In a match against Griqualand West in the 1946/47 season, White took three catches from three successive balls while fielding at short leg.

References

External links
 

1909 births
1987 deaths
South African cricketers
Border cricketers